Andrew Mair was a Scottish football player, who played for Dumbarton during the 1920s.

References 

Scottish footballers
Dumbarton F.C. players
Scottish Football League players
Year of birth missing
Year of death missing
Association football midfielders